William Simpson Davidson (May 10, 1884 – May 23, 1954) was an outfielder in Major League Baseball from 1909 to 1911.

Sources

1884 births
1954 deaths
Baseball players from Indiana
Major League Baseball center fielders
Chicago Cubs players
Brooklyn Superbas players
Brooklyn Dodgers players
Fort Dodge Gypsumites players
Lincoln Ducklings players
Lincoln Treeplanters players
Lincoln Railsplitters players
Omaha Rourkes players
Sioux City Packers players
Sioux City Indians players